In probability theory, Gauss's inequality (or the Gauss inequality) gives an upper bound on the probability that a unimodal random variable lies more than any given distance from its mode.

Let X be a unimodal random variable with mode m, and let τ 2 be the expected value of (X − m)2. (τ 2 can also be expressed as (μ − m)2 + σ 2, where μ and σ are the mean and standard deviation of X.)  Then for any positive value of k,

The theorem was first proved by Carl Friedrich Gauss in 1823.

Extensions to higher-order moments 

Winkler in 1866 extended Gauss' inequality to rth moments  where r > 0 and the distribution is unimodal with a mode of zero. This is sometimes called Camp–Meidell's inequality.

 

 

Gauss' bound has been subsequently sharpened and extended to apply to departures from the mean rather than the mode due to the Vysochanskiï–Petunin inequality. The latter has been extended by Dharmadhikari and Joag-Dev

 

where s is a constant satisfying both s > r + 1 and s(s − r − 1) = rr and r > 0.

It can be shown that these inequalities are the best possible and that further sharpening of the bounds requires that additional restrictions be placed on the distributions.

See also
Vysochanskiï–Petunin inequality, a similar result for the distance from the mean rather than the mode 
Chebyshev's inequality, concerns distance from the mean without requiring unimodality
 Concentration inequality – a summary of tail-bounds on random variables.

References

Probabilistic inequalities